Schistovalva is a genus of moths in the family Gelechiidae. It contains the species Schistovalva trachyptera, which is found in Namibia.

References

Gelechiinae
Monotypic moth genera
Moths of Africa